SNV may refer to:

 Schweizerische Normen-Vereinigung (Swiss Association for Standardization), Swias technical association for participation in international standards development
 Sin Nombre virus, agent of hantavirus pulmonary syndrome
 Single-nucleotide variant, an example of single-nucleotide polymorphism
 Southern Nevada
 Srpsko narodno vijeće (Serb National Council), group representing ethnic Serbs in Croatia
 SNV (typeface), a typeface used on road signs in some countries
 SNV Netherlands Development Organisation (formerly Stichting Nederlandse Vrijwilligers, "Foundation of Netherlands Volunteers"), a Dutch NGO for international development
 SNV Valiant, U.S. Navy version of the Vultee BT-13 Valiant trainer aircraft
 Systemic necrotizing vasculitis (Systemic vasculitis), inflammation of blood vessels leading to necrosis